Austria has been participating at the Deaflympics since 1931 and  has earned a total of 78 medals.

Medal tallies

Summer Deaflympics

Winter Deaflympics

See also
Austria at the Paralympics
Austria at the Olympics

References

External links
Deaflympics official website
2017 Deaflympics

 
Nations at the Deaflympics
Austria at multi-sport events
Parasports in Austria
Deaf culture in Austria